The Wellenkuppe is a mountain of the Swiss Pennine Alps, located west of Zermatt in the canton of Valais. It lies on the range separating the Val d'Anniviers from the Mattertal, just east of the Ober Gabelhorn.

References

External links

 Wellenkuppe on SummitPost
 Wellenkuppe on Hikr

Mountains of the Alps
Alpine three-thousanders
Mountains of Valais
Mountains of Switzerland
Three-thousanders of Switzerland